Edward Stanisław Długajczyk (born 1939) is a Polish historian. He is specializing in history of Upper Silesia in the 20th century.

He graduated in Polish philology from Jagiellonian University. In 1972 he gained a Ph.D. from University of Silesia in Katowice. In 1982 E.Długajczyk passed his habilitation, since 2004 title of professor.

Works 
Sanacja śląska 1926-1939: zarys dziejów politycznych (1983)
Ludzie z bieruńskiego ratusza: rzecz o burmistrzach i radzie miejskiej w latach 1919-1939 (1989)
Bieruń Stary w dokumentach archiwalnych: materiały do planu zagospodarowania przestrzennego z lat 1946-1947 (1990)
Oblicze polityczne i własnościowe prasy polskiej w województwie śląskim 1922-1939 (1990)
Trudne lata nadziei: Bieruń Stary 1945-1950 (1990)
Podział Górnego Śląska w 1922 roku (1992)
Tajny front na granicy cieszyńskiej: wywiad i dywersja w latach 1919-1939 (1993)
Grupy Z i N : polskie przygotowania dywersji wojskowej w Niemczech w latach 1921-1925 (1997)
Wywiad polski na Górnym Śląsku 1919-1922 (2001)
Polska konspiracja wojskowa na Śląsku Cieszyńskim w latach 1919-1920 (2005)

References 
Noty o autorach (2008). In. Archiwa i archiwalia górnośląskie. Vol. 1. Katowice.

External links 
 

Jagiellonian University alumni
University of Silesia in Katowice alumni
20th-century Polish historians
Polish male non-fiction writers
1939 births
Living people
Historians of Poland
21st-century Polish historians